Above the City is the eighth studio album by Swedish band Club 8.

Reception

Above the City received positive reviews from critics. On Metacritic, the album holds a score of 74/100 based on 8 reviews, indicating "generally favorable reviews."

Track listing 
 "Kill Kill Kill" - 03:25
 "Stop Taking My Time" - 02:50
 "You Could Be Anybody" - 04:08
 "Run" - 03:38
 "Interlude" - 00:56
 "Hot Sun" - 03:25
 "A Small Piece of Heaven" - 02:48
 "I'm Not Gonna Grow Old" - 03:32
 "Interlude #2" - 00:21
 "Into Air" - 04:10
 "Instrumental" - 01:15
 "Travel" - 02:09
 "Less than Love - 03:17
 "Straight as an Arrow - 03:18

References 

2013 albums
Club 8 albums
Labrador Records albums